Mozier Landing is an unincorporated community in Calhoun County, Illinois, United States. Mozier Landing is located along the Mississippi River north of Hamburg.

References

Unincorporated communities in Calhoun County, Illinois
Unincorporated communities in Illinois